Bahram Farid Ghara-Ghisahlagh (was born 1984 in Urmia, West Azerbaijan) is a volleyball player from Iran, who plays as an Outside Spiker for Shahrdari Tabriz VC in Iranian Volleyball Super League.

References

Living people
Iranian men's volleyball players
People from Urmia
1984 births